Upside Down is the third studio album by American band Set It Off. The album was released on October 7, 2016 through record labels Equal Vision Records and Rude Records. The first single from the album, "Uncontainable", was released on March 18, 2016, alongside the announcement of Upside Down.

Track listing

Charts

References

2016 albums
Set It Off (band) albums
Equal Vision Records albums